Hadiya Khalaf Abbas (1958 – 13 November 2021) was a Syrian politician who served as the Speaker of the People's Council of Syria from June 2016 to July 2017. She is the only woman to have held the post.

Biography and career
Abbas was born in Deir ez-Zor Governorate in 1958 and got a doctorate in agricultural engineering from the University of Aleppo. She was also professor at the Al-Furat University.

After the 2016 Syrian parliamentary election, Abbas was elected Speaker of the People's Council of Syrian in the first session of the chamber on 6 June 2016, becoming the first woman to reach this office. She won uncontested.

On 20 July 2017, Syria's Parliament issued a resolution discharging Abbas from her post as Speaker, with a majority of member votes. Abbas was accused by some parliamentarians of “preventing some members from submitting their interposition and turning a blind eye to their willingness to discuss a number of articles according to the constitutional rules,” a behavior other parliamentarians described  as “irresponsible and illegal.” Deputy Speaker was appointed interim speaker until the voting of Hammouda Sabbagh as Abbas' successor took place on 28 September 2017.

Abbas died on 13 November 2021, at Military Hospital of Deir ez-Zor at the age of 63 after suffering a heart attack.

References

1958 births
2021 deaths
Arab Socialist Ba'ath Party – Syria Region politicians
Speakers of the People's Assembly of Syria
Women legislative speakers
People from Deir ez-Zor Governorate
21st-century Syrian women politicians
21st-century Syrian politicians